The Larson F-12 Baby was a single engine, single seat sports biplane built in the US in the early 1960s. It was intended to produce it ready to fly or homebuilt from kits or plans but only one was completed.

Design and development
The Baby was a single bay biplane with stagger.  The wings were wooden structures with two spars and fabric covering; the upper wing had 1° of dihedral and the lower one 3°.  There were ailerons on both wings, with aluminium frames and again fabric covered. The fuselage and empennage were fabric covered, welded steel structures. It had fixed conventional landing gear with rubber sprung main legs, aluminium wheels with brakes and a sprung tailwheel.

The Baby was powered by an  Continental C85 air-cooled flat four, its fuel tank in the fuselage behind the engine and in front of the single seat, open cockpit.

Specifications

References

Homebuilt aircraft
1960s United States sport aircraft
Biplanes
Single-engined tractor aircraft
Aircraft first flown in 1961